Swiss Nights Vol. 1 is a live album led by saxophonist Dexter Gordon recorded in Zurich in 1975 and released on the Danish SteepleChase label.

Reception

In his review for AllMusic, Scott Yanow said "All of the performances are at least ten minutes long and there are some rambling moments, but in general, the music is quite rewarding. This was one of Dexter Gordon's prime periods".

Track listing
 "Tenor Madness" (Sonny Rollins) - 10:39
 "Wave" (Antônio Carlos Jobim) - 10:39
 "You've Changed" (Bill Carey, Carl T. Fischer) - 9:59
 "Days of Wine and Roses" (Henry Mancini, Johnny Mercer) - 12:28
 "The Panther" (Dexter Gordon) - 13:17 Bonus track on CD reissue 
 "Montmartre/The Theme" (Dexter Gordon/Traditional) - 9:53 Bonus track on CD reissue

Personnel
Dexter Gordon - tenor saxophone
Kenny Drew - piano
Niels-Henning Ørsted Pedersen - bass 
Alex Riel - drums

References

1976 live albums
Dexter Gordon live albums
SteepleChase Records live albums